Pseudophilautus regius, known as Polonnaruwa shrub frog is a species of frogs in the family Rhacophoridae.

It is endemic to Sri Lanka.

Its natural habitats are subtropical or tropical dry shrubland, subtropical or tropical moist shrubland, and rural gardens.
It is possibly threatened by habitat loss.

References

regius
Endemic fauna of Sri Lanka
Frogs of Sri Lanka
Taxa named by Rohan Pethiyagoda
Amphibians described in 2004
Taxonomy articles created by Polbot